David Muzzey may refer to:

 David P. Muzzey (1838–1910), American lawyer and overseer of the poor from Massachusetts
 David Saville Muzzey (1870–1965), American historian